Christian Obi (born 2 January 1967) is a Nigerian footballer. He competed in the men's tournament at the 1988 Summer Olympics.

References

External links

1967 births
Living people
Nigerian footballers
Nigeria international footballers
Olympic footballers of Nigeria
Footballers at the 1988 Summer Olympics
Place of birth missing (living people)
Association football goalkeepers